Zsuzsanna Szabó may refer to:

 Zsuzsanna Szabó-Olgyai (born 1973), Hungarian pole vaulter
 Zsuzsanna Szabó (footballer) (born 1991), Hungarian footballer